Vladimir Velmar-Janković (August 10, 1895 - August 12, 1976) was a Serbian writer and member of Serbia's World War II quisling government.

Biography
Velmar-Janković was born in the village of Čaglić near Lipik, at the time in the Kingdom of Croatia-Slavonia, Austria-Hungary. He finished elementary school in Varaždin, attended the Serb Tekelijanum in Buda and finished university in Zagreb.

During the Second World War, Velmar-Janković served as assistant to the Serbian minister of culture and religion Velibor Jonić. The ministry was responsible for racist teachings in Serbian schools during the war years.

He left the country on September 17, 1944, when the Serbian administration was defeated, and subsequently moved to Rome, Italy for the following two years. He was considered by the Communist Yugoslav Government to be an enemy of the state. After two years in Rome he moved to Barcelona, Spain. There he wrote under the pen name of V.J.Wukmir. He lived in Barcelona until his death from a car accident in 1976.

Since the dissolution of communist Yugoslavia, Velmar-Janković's works have become more widely available in Serbia. His daughter is Serbian writer Svetlana Velmar-Janković. She has lobbied to name a street in Belgrade after her father, in honour of his written work about the city Pogled s Kalemegdana. This has been opposed by some writers due to Velmar-Janković's role as a collaborator with the occupying Axis forces during the Second World War. She has attempted to have her father officially rehabilitated by the Serbian government.

Works
 Svetla u noći, Zagreb, 1919
 Ivan Mandušin, Belgrade, 1922
 Novi, Belgrade, 1922
 Robovi, Belgrade, 1924
 Dečak s Une, Belgrade, 1926
 U vrtlogu, Belgrade, 1926
 Duhovna kriza današnjice, Belgrade, 1928
 Bez ljubavi, Belgrade, 1932
 Sreća A. D., Belgrade, 1932
 Državni neprijatelj broj 3, Belgrade, 1936
 Građanska komedija, Belgrade, 1938
 Pogled s Kalemegdana, Belgrade, 1938
 Dnevna vest, Belgrade, 1941
 Psicologia de la orientacion vital (Psihologija životnog opredeljenja), Barcelona 1960; 
 El hombre ante si mismo (Čovek pred samim sobom), Barsclona 1964
 Emocion y sufrimento (Emocije i patnje), Barcelona 1967

Notes

Sources 
 Vladimir Velmar-Janković
 In memory of the founder of the Centre for Psychology, Danas

1895 births
1976 deaths
People from Lipik
Serbs of Croatia
Serbian writers
Serbian dramatists and playwrights
Serbian science fiction writers
Government ministers of Serbia
20th-century dramatists and playwrights